Isaac Raphael Alfandari (died ca. 1690), son of Ḥayyim, and father of Ḥayyim the Younger, lived in Constantinople in the 17th century. Some of his responsa are published in his father's collection, Maggid me-Reshit, Constantinople, 1710.

Jewish Encyclopedia bibliography 
Isaac Benjacob, Oẓar ha-Sefarim, p. 291;
Joseph Zedner, Cat. Hebr. Books Brit. Mus. s.v.

See also
 Alfandari

References 
 

1690s deaths
17th-century rabbis from the Ottoman Empire
17th-century writers from the Ottoman Empire
Year of birth unknown